The 1946–47 Svenska mästerskapet was the 16th season of Svenska mästerskapet, a tournament held to determine the Swedish Champions of men's handball. The qualification criteria for the tournament was changed for this season. All Allsvenskan teams and all District Champions qualified, along with invited teams from Division II. 32 teams competed in the tournament. Majornas IK were the five-time defending champions, but were eliminated by Sandvikens IF in the Second Round. Redbergslids IK won their third title, defeating cross-town rivals IK Heim in the final. The semifinals and final were played on 15–16 March in Mässhallen in Gothenburg. The final was watched by 4,198 spectators.

Results

First Round 
 Bodens BK–Umeå IK 9–19
 Upsala Studenters IF–IK Göta 14–10
 Ludvika FFI–SoIK Hellas 8–23
 Motala AIF–KA 3 Fårösund 13–12
 Sandvikens IF–GIF Sundsvall 21–5
 Majornas IK–F 11 Nyköping 21–10
 GF Kroppskultur–IK Heim 9–15
 IFK Malmö–IFK Karlskrona 10–11
 Sollefteå GIF–IFK Östersund 18–14
 Rynninge IK–Redbergslids IK 4–18
 Skövde AIK–Karlstads BIK 16–7
 IFK Lidingö–Västerås IK result unknown
 Västerås HF–IF Guif 14–8
 Lugi HF–IFK Eksjö result unknown
 IFK Trelleborg–Ystads IF 3–10
 HK Drott–IFK Kristianstad 13–18

Second Round 
 Umeå IK–Upsala Studenters IF 9–8
 SoIK Hellas–Motala AIF 19–8
 Sandvikens IF–Majornas IK 15–10 
 IK Heim–IFK Karlskrona 9–8
 Sollefteå GIF–Redbergslids IK 5–18
 Skövde AIK–IFK Lidingö 10–8
 Västerås HF–Lugi HF 13–11
 Ystads IF–IFK Kristianstad 17–13

Quarterfinals 
 Umeå IK–SoIK Hellas 7–10
 Sandvikens IF–IK Heim 7–8
 Redbergslids IK–Skövde AIK 10–8
 Västerås HF–Ystads IF 8–10

Semifinals 
 SoIK Hellas–IK Heim 9–15
 Redbergslids IK–Ystads IF 12–9

Match for third place 
 SoIK Hellas–Ystads IF 8–6

Final 
 IK Heim–Redbergslids IK 7–8

Champions 
The following players for Redbergslids IK received a winner's medal: Henry Öberg, Valter Larsson (1 goal in the final), Lars-Eric Olsson, Gösta Swerin (1), Rolf Andreasson (2), Sten Åkerstedt (2), Olle Juthage (2), Kimfors, Bertil Lundberg and Holger Karlsson.

See also
 1946–47 Allsvenskan (men's handball)

References 

Swedish handball competitions